Bombora is an indigenous Australian term for an area of large sea waves breaking over a shallow area such as a submerged rock shelf, reef, or sand bank that is located some distance from the shoreline and beach surf break. In slang it is also called a bommie.

As the wave passes over the shallow area its shape is raised and steepened, creating a localised wave formation. The size and shape of bombora waves makes them attractive to surfers willing to take the risk of riding what is generally considered a hazardous pursuit.

These formations can pose a significant danger even in good weather as a bombora may not be identifiable because it may not always have breaking waves.

The term Bombora was given wide circulation in 2009 on ABC TV with the airing of a documentary titled Bombora - The Story of Australian Surfing, which received a nomination for the 2010 Logie Awards in Australia. The documentary explored historical dimensions of the relationship between surf culture and Australian cultural identity.

"Bombora" is also the title of a popular music instrumental released in 1963 by Australian surf rock band The Atlantics.

The term bombora is also used for a sketchy surf spot where waves seem to break on the outside.

Well known instances
 Cowaramup Bombora ("Cow Bombie") - near Margaret River, Western Australia, location of the 2011 and 2015 Oakley Biggest Wave award-winning rides.
 Dobroyd Bombora - in Sydney Harbour, New South Wales.
 Jibbon Bombora - at Bundeena in the south of Sydney
 Outer Bombora - at Yallingup, Western Australia.
 "The Bommie" - on the northern side of The Penguin's Head, Culburra Beach, New South Wales.
Killcare and Maitland Bay bomboras in Bouddi National Park, NS
 Queenscliff Bombora - in Sydney, New South Wales

See also

Surf culture

References

External links 
 Jibbon Loop Track

Australian Aboriginal words and phrases